Gerónimo Beato (born 10 November 1995 in Montevideo) is an Uruguayan footballer. He is the son of Vito Beato, who is a football manager.

Club career
Born in Montevideo, Beato started in the youth levels of River Plate Montevideo.

In March 2014, he travelled to Italy to try luck on Serie D side Ripa La Fenadora. He could not play much after suffering a long injury and he left the club after finishing his contract, staying a long time without playing.

Later, he went to Switzerland signing with FC Lugano. He did not have minutes in the first team and remained some months till he finally returned to Uruguay to defend his father's coaching team Villa Teresa which had just promoted to Uruguayan Top Division.

After one year at Huracán, Beato returned to Villa Teresa in 2019.

References

External links
 
 

1995 births
Living people
Association football midfielders
Uruguayan footballers
Uruguayan expatriate footballers
Club Atlético River Plate (Montevideo) players
FC Lugano players
Villa Teresa players
Huracán F.C. players
Uruguayan Primera División players
Uruguayan Segunda División players
Uruguayan expatriate sportspeople in Switzerland
Uruguayan expatriate sportspeople in Italy
Expatriate footballers in Switzerland
Expatriate footballers in Italy